Olsburg is a city in Pottawatomie County, Kansas, United States.  As of the 2020 census, the population of the city was 218.

History
Olsburg was laid out in the late 1870s. It was originally built up chiefly by Swedes. Olsburg was named for Ole Thrulson, a pioneer settler.

The first post office in Olsburg was founded in 1873, but the name of the post office was spelled Olesburgh until 1887.

Geography
Olsburg is located at  (39.431052, -96.614439).

Demographics

Olsburg is part of the Manhattan, Kansas Metropolitan Statistical Area.

2010 census
As of the census of 2010, there were 219 people, 85 households, and 58 families residing in the city. The racial makeup of the city was 97.7% White and 2.3% from two or more races. Hispanic or Latino of any race were 2.7% of the population.

There were 85 households, of which 36.5% had children under the age of 18 living with them, 57.6% were married couples living together, 7.1% had a female householder with no husband present, 3.5% had a male householder with no wife present, and 31.8% were non-families. 27.1% of all households were made up of individuals, and 9.5% had someone living alone who was 65 years of age or older. The average household size was 2.58 and the average family size was 3.17.

The median age in the city was 33.2 years. 33.8% of residents were under the age of 18; 3.7% were between the ages of 18 and 24; 26% were from 25 to 44; 25.6% were from 45 to 64; and 11% were 65 years of age or older. The gender makeup of the city was 48.9% male and 51.1% female.

2000 census
As of the census of 2000, there were 192 people, 80 households, and 63 families residing in the city. The racial makeup of the city was 99.48% White and 0.52% Native American.

There were 80 households, out of which 26.3% had children under the age of 18 living with them, 68.8% were married couples living together, 7.5% had a female householder with no husband present, and 21.3% were non-families. 18.8% of all households were made up of individuals, and 5.0% had someone living alone who was 65 years of age or older. The average household size was 2.40 and the average family size was 2.75.

In the city, the population was spread out, with 21.4% under the age of 18, 9.9% from 18 to 24, 24.5% from 25 to 44, 17.7% from 45 to 64, and 26.6% who were 65 years of age or older. The median age was 42 years. For every 100 females, there were 100.0 males. For every 100 females age 18 and over, there were 104.1 males.

The median income for a household in the city was $37,969, and the median income for a family was $39,531. Males had a median income of $27,386 versus $23,281 for females. The per capita income for the city was $14,268. 5.0% of the population and 7.2% of families were below the poverty line. Out of the total population, none of those under the age of 18 and 19.1% of those 65 and older were living below the poverty line.

Education
The community is served by Blue Valley USD 384 public school district.

See also
 Tuttle Creek Lake and Tuttle Creek State Park

References

Further reading

External links
 City of Olsburg
 Olsburg - Directory of Public Officials
 Olsburg city map, KDOT

Cities in Pottawatomie County, Kansas
Cities in Kansas
Manhattan, Kansas metropolitan area